Milan Mešter (Cyrillic: Милан Мештер; born 23 October 1975) is a Montenegrin former professional footballer who played as an attacking midfielder.

Club career
After playing for Mogren in the 1998–99 First League of FR Yugoslavia, Mešter moved abroad to Greece and signed a contract with Panachaiki. He appeared in 22 matches and scored once during the 1999–2000 Alpha Ethniki. In the 2001 winter transfer window, Mešter returned to FR Yugoslavia and joined Hajduk Kula. He made 75 appearances and netted 21 goals for the club in the top flight over the next two and a half years. In the summer of 2003, Mešter moved abroad for the second time and joined Chinese club Ningbo Yaoma. He spent half a season in Asia, before returning to Serbia and Montenegro and signing with Zemun.

References

External links
 
 

1975 births
Living people
Footballers from Podgorica
Association football midfielders
Serbia and Montenegro footballers
Montenegrin footballers
FK Iskra Danilovgrad players
FK Budućnost Podgorica players
FK Mogren players
Panachaiki F.C. players
Patraikos F.C. players
FK Hajduk Kula players
Gansu Tianma F.C. players
FK Zemun players
FK Zeta players
FK Lovćen players
FK Mornar players
First League of Serbia and Montenegro players
Super League Greece players
China League One players
Montenegrin First League players
Serbia and Montenegro expatriate footballers
Expatriate footballers in Greece
Serbia and Montenegro expatriate sportspeople in Greece
Expatriate footballers in China
Serbia and Montenegro expatriate sportspeople in China
Montenegrin football managers
FK Kom managers